In biology, the BBCH-scale for hops describes the phenological development of Humulus lupulus (hops) using the BBCH-scale.

The phenological growth stages and BBCH-identification keys of hops are:

References

 

BBCH-scale
Humulus